Auriane Mallo (born 11 October 1993) is a French left-handed épée fencer, three-time team European champion, and 2016 Olympian.

Medal Record

European Championship

Grand Prix

World Cup

dReferences

External links
 

1993 births
Living people
French female épée fencers
Olympic fencers of France
Fencers at the 2016 Summer Olympics
Universiade medalists in fencing
Place of birth missing (living people)
Universiade gold medalists for France
Medalists at the 2013 Summer Universiade
20th-century French women
21st-century French women